Robert Laycock (1833 – 14 August 1881) was a Liberal Party politician.

Laycock was elected Liberal MP for North Lincolnshire in 1880, but died just over a year later. He had also previously contested North Nottinghamshire in February 1872 and Nottingham in 1874.

References

External links
 

Liberal Party (UK) MPs for English constituencies
UK MPs 1880–1885
1833 births
1881 deaths